Claus Bantzer (born 10 October 1942 in Marburg) is a German church musician, composer and director.

Life and work 
Claus Bantzer was born in Marburg in 1942 into an artist's family. His older brother Christoph Bantzer is an actor.

Bantzer began studying piano, organ, and conducting at the music school of the university of Frankfurt am Main. He continued his studies in Hamburg (Hochschule für Musik und Theater), where he became a master student of the organ teacher Heinz Wunderlich. He was also Wunderlich's assistant at the church St. Jacobi in Hamburg.

Since 1975, Bantzer has been organist at the church of St. Johannis Harvestehude in Hamburg. Later, the honorary title of Kirchenmusikdirektor was conferred onto him. At this church, he leads two choirs, the main church choir of St. Johannis and the chamber choir Harvestehuder Kammerchor, which he founded.

As a composer of music for more than 20 films, he has worked closely the film directors Peter Lilienthal, Doris Dörrie, Jan Schütte and Tevfik Başer. Apart from his compositions for film, he has also composed other works, usually combining religious lyrics with modern music, in particular jazz.

Film music composed by Bantzer 
La Insurrección (1980)
Geburt der Hexe (1980)
Dear Mr. Wonderful (1982)
Das Wagnis des Arnold Janssen (1983)
 (1985)
Men... (1985)
40 Quadratmeter Deutschland (1986)
 (1986)
Adrian und die Römer (1987)
Das Schweigen des Dichters (1987)
 (1987)
Wann, wenn nicht jetzt (1987, TV)
Der Radfahrer von San Cristóbal (1988)
Farewell to False Paradise (1989)
Winckelmanns Reisen (1990)
Nach Patagonien (1991)
Lebewohl, Fremde (1991)
 (1994)
Wasserman – Der singende Hund (1995, TV)
Angesichts der Wälder (1996)
Cherry Blossoms (2008)

Other compositions - selection 
 time before – time after, composed together with Stephan Krause for strings and percussion (2007)
 Liebe ist nichts, sie wachse denn zuhöchst, composition for viola, chamber choir and percussion group based on a text by Paul Valéry (2002)
 Tu deinen Mund auf für die Stummen, Jazz-cantata, original performance in 1993 by the choir of the Northern German Television (NDR)
 Missa Popularis/Jazz Messe, original performance during the NDR Jazz-Workshop held in November 1980

Works on CD - selection 
 Claus Bantzer: Missa Popularis, Jazz-Messe, live recording made on 16 June 2001, director Claus Bantzer, Arte Nova (Sony BMG) 2001.
 Es kommt ein Schiff, geladen..., Christmas music named after the hymn, Harvestehuder Kammerchor, director Claus Bantzer, Arte Nova (Sony BMG) 2000.
 Das Hohelied Salomos, collection of love songs, Harvestehuder Kammerchor, director Claus Bantzer, Arte Nova (Sony BMG) 1999.
 Samsara, organ improvisations by Claus Bantzer, Arte Nova (Sony BMG) 1998.
 Chormusik der Romantik, Harvestehuder Kammerchor, director Claus Bantzer, Arte Nova  (Sony BMG) 1997.
 Mariengesänge, Harvestehuder Kammerchor, director Claus Bantzer, Arte Nova (Sony BMG) 1996.

Honours 
 2004 Member of the Hamburg Academy of Fine Arts (Freie Akademie der Künste in Hamburg)
 2001 Max-Brauer-Preis in Hamburg
 1994 Prix de la Sacem of the Jewish-Israeli Film festival in France
 1987 Bantzer received the highest honour in German cinema at the Bundesfilmpreis, where the Filmband in Gold was conferred upon him in the category film music for 40m2 Deutschland, Paradies and Das Schweigen des Dichters

External links 
 
 Music at St. Johannis Harvestehude

1942 births
German classical organists
German male organists
German film score composers
German male composers
Living people
Male film score composers
Music directors
People from Marburg
20th-century German composers
21st-century German composers
21st-century organists
20th-century German male musicians
21st-century German male musicians
Kirchenmusikdirektor
Male classical organists